Whitburn Football Club are a Scottish football club based in Whitburn, West Lothian.

History
Formed on 31 May 1930 as Whitburn Amateurs F.C., they turned Junior over the summer months of 1934. They play their home games at Central Park.

Nicknamed The Burnie, the club's colours are claret and amber. They presently play in the East of Scotland Football League. The club have won the Scottish Junior Cup on one occasion, defeating Johnstone Burgh on penalties in the 1999–00 final.

The team was managed from 2014 to 2016 by former St Mirren boss Tom Hendrie.

Club staff

Board of directors

Coaching staff

Source

Current squad
As of 31 October 2022

Managerial history

c Caretaker manager

¹

Honours
Scottish Junior Cup
Winners: 1999–2000
Runners-up: 1965–66, 1994–95

Other honours
East of Scotland League Conference X winners: 2021–22
East Region Premier Division winners: 1985–86, 1986–87, 1988–89, 1989–90, 1995–96, 1997–98, 2000–01
East Region Division One winners: 1977–78
Lothian District Division One winners: 2004–05
East of Scotland Junior Cup winners: 1965–66, 1968–69, 1969–70, 1973–74, 1997–98, 2001–02
Brown Cup winners: 1959–60, 1967–68, 1971–72, 1972–73, 2000–01

References

External links
 Official club site
 Fan website (archived from 2016)
 Twitter
 Social Club

 
Football in West Lothian
Football clubs in Scotland
Scottish Junior Football Association clubs
Association football clubs established in 1933
1933 establishments in Scotland
Whitburn, West Lothian
East of Scotland Football League teams